Cryptologic can refer to:

Cryptography, the study of message secrecy
CryptoLogic, a provider of online gambling software